The women's heptathlon competition at the 2006 Asian Games in Doha, Qatar was held on 8–9 December 2006 at the Khalifa International Stadium.

Schedule
All times are Arabia Standard Time (UTC+03:00)

Records

Results 
Legend
DNS — Did not start
NM — No mark

100 metres hurdles 
 Wind – Heat 1: −0.7 m/s
 Wind – Heat 2: −0.3 m/s

High jump

Shot put

200 metres 
 Wind – Heat 1: +0.8 m/s
 Wind – Heat 2: +0.4 m/s

Long jump

Javelin throw

800 metres

Summary

References

External links 
100m Hurdles Results Heat 1
100m Hurdles Results Heat 2
High Jump Results
Shot Put Results
200m Results Heat 1
200m Results Heat 2
Long Jump Results
Javelin Throw Results
800m Results
Summary

Athletics at the 2006 Asian Games
2006